Béatrice Lamarche (born 1 October 1998) is a Canadian long track speed skater, who has been active since 2010. Lamarche is a sprinter.

As a junior, Lamarche became national champion five times and participated at the 2016, 2017 and 2018 World Junior Speed Skating Championships and ISU Junior World Cup Speed Skating events. At the elite level she made her ISU Speed Skating World Cup debut during the 2016-17 speed skating season. She won at the 2019 Canadian Single Distance Championships the bronze medal in the 1000 metres event. Due to that result she represented her nation at the 2020 World Single Distance Speed Skating Championships in the 1000 metres event, finishing 21st.

She is the daughter of former olympian speed skater Ben Lamarche and a niece of former olympian speed skater Marie-Pierre Lamarche.

Records

Personal records

References

External links 
 

1998 births
Place of birth missing (living people)
Canadian female speed skaters
Living people
Canadian female short track speed skaters
21st-century Canadian women

Université Laval alumni